Sierra Leonean passports are issued to Sierra Leonean citizens for travel outside Sierra Leone. Sierra Leonean citizens can travel to member states of the Economic Community of West African States (ECOWAS).

Physical properties
 Surname
 Given names
 Nationality Sierra Leonean
 Date of birth 
 Sex  
 Place of birth  
 Date of Expiry 
 Passport number

Languages

The data page/information page is printed in English and French.

See also 
 ECOWAS passports
 List of passports
 Visa requirements for Sierra Leonean citizens

Passports by country
Government of Sierra Leone